A list of films produced in the Philippines in the 1980s. For an A-Z see :Category:Philippine films.

1980

1981

1982

1983

1984

1985

1986

1987

1988

1989

References

1980s
Films
Philippines